Forgive Me My Love (Russian: Прости Меня Моя Любовь) is Russian singer Zemfira's second album. It features the hit singles "Forgive Me My Love" and "You Want?". It further popularized her recognizable pop-rock sound. It became the best-selling Zemfira album with more than 1,500,000 copies sold.

Track listing
 "Шкалят Датчики"         (Clipping Gauges)
 "ZERO"
 "Созрела"                (Ripened)
 "Хочешь?"                (Do You Want?)
 "Рассветы"               (Dawns)
 "Город"                  (City)
 "Ненавижу"               ([I] Hate)
 "Сигареты"               (Cigarettes)
 "Доказано"               (Proven)
 "Прости Меня Моя Любовь" (Forgive Me My Love)
 "Искала"                 ([I've] Searched)
 "Не Отпускай"            (Do Not Let Go)
 "London" (bonus track)

Personnel 
Zemfira - Vocals, Lyrics, Acoustic Guitar
Sergei Sozinov - Drums
Vadim Solov'ev - Guitar
Rinat Akhmadiev - Bass
Sergei Miroliubov - Keyboard, Percussion
Vladimir Ovchinnikov "Tone Studios" Moscow - Recording
Ray Staff "Whitfield Street Studio" - Mastering
John Brough - Director
Andrew Nichols - Assistant

2000 albums
Zemfira albums